Pop-Up! Ker-Ching! and the Possibilities of Modern Shopping is the fifth studio album by Mozart Estate, the musical project of former Felt and Denim frontman Lawrence. It is the first album to be released under the moniker after changing from the band's original name Go-Kart Mozart. It was released on January 27, 2023 on Lawrence's West Midlands Records, a subsidiary of Cherry Red. 

Lawrence has stated that the album's main theme is about consumerism and shopping: "Walking around in my spare time I’m exposed to people who shop constantly. That is what my life is about: shopping and watching shoppers." An original working title for the album was Poundland and the Possibilities of Modern Shopping. The album includes a re-recording of "Relative Poverty", which previously appeared on the band's previous album Mozart's Mini-Mart, and was released as a 10" single prior to the album's release.

Track listing

Charts

References

2023 albums
Go-Kart Mozart albums